Holy Cross Church, or variants thereof,  may refer to:

Canada
 Church of the Holy Cross (Skatin). a first nations church in Skookumchuck Hot Springs, British Columbia
 Holy Cross Church, Wikwemikong, Ontario

China
 Holy Cross Church, Wanzhou
 Holy Cross Church, Wuxi

Croatia 
 Church of the Holy Cross, Nin, a Croatian Pre-Romanesque Catholic church originating from the 9th century in Nin
 Sisak, Church of Holy Cross

Cyprus 
 Church of the Holy Cross, Nicosia

Denmark
 Holy Cross Church, Copenhagen

Finland
 Holy Cross Church, Hattula, in Hattula, Finland, is the oldest church in the former Tavastia (Häme) province
 Holy Cross Church, Iisalmi, in Iisalmi, Finland
 Holy Cross Church, Tampere, the name given to a religious building affiliated with the Catholic Church and is located in the city of Tampere, Finland
 Church of the Holy Cross, Rauma, a medieval fieldstone church in Rauma, Finland. It is located in the UNESCO World Heritage Site of Old Rauma. The church stands by the small stream of Raumanjoki (Rauma river)

France
 Église de l′Invention de la Sainte-Croix  in Kaysersberg, Haut-Rhin

Germany
 Catholic Holy Cross Church, Augsburg
 
 Neuwerkskirche, Erfurt, dedicated to the Holy Cross
 Holy Cross Church, Frankfurt-Bornheim, a Roman Catholic church in the Bornheim district of Frankfurt am Main
 Kreuzkirche, Hanover
 Holy Cross Church, Lehre, currently a Lutheran church
 Holy Cross Church, Munich, the oldest preserved church in the city
 Holy Cross Church (Neuenwalde Convent), the church of the Neuenwalde Convent
 Abbey of the Holy Cross, Rostock, founded in the 13th century by Cistercian nuns

India
 Holy Cross Shrine Mapranam, Kerala

 Holy Cross Church, Silchar, former cathedral

Norway
Holy Cross Church, Bergen, a church of the Church of Norway in the city centre of Bergen

Poland
 Holy Cross Church, Warsaw, a Roman Catholic house of worship in Warsaw, Poland. Located on Krakowskie Przedmieście opposite the main Warsaw University campus, it is one of the most notable Baroque churches in Poland's capital
 Collegiate Church of the Holy Cross and St. Bartholomew in Wrocław

Portugal
 Holy Cross Church, Braga, in Portuguese, Igreja de Santa Cruz is a Portuguese 17th century church in Braga, Portugal, dedicated to the Holy Cross

Russia
 Holy Cross Church, Nakhichevan on Don, an 18th-century Armenian church in Nor Nakhichevan. It is the oldest surviving monument in the borders of Rostov-on-Don

Slovakia
 Holy Cross Church, Banská Bystrica

Sri Lanka
 Holy Cross Church, Gampaha, in Western Province

Syria
 Holy Cross Church (Aleppo), an Armenian Catholic Church in the Ouroubeh quarter (near Aziziyeh) of Aleppo, Syria

Turkey
 Armenian Cathedral of the Holy Cross, on Akdamar Island

Ukraine
 Surb Khach Monastery, a medieval Monastery of the Holy Cross in Crimea
 The Exaltation of the Holy Cross Church, an Orthodox church of the guilds of Tanners and Crockers in Kyiv.

United Kingdom

England
 Holy Cross Church, Binstead, Isle of Wight
 Holy Cross Church, Bristol
 Holy Cross Church, Burley, Rutland
 Holy Cross Church, Bury, Cambridgeshire
 Crediton Parish Church (Church of the Holy Cross and the Mother of Him who hung thereon), Crediton, Devon
 Holy Cross Church, Leicester
 Church of the Holy Cross, Pershore, Worcestershire
 Holy Cross Church, St Pancras, London
 Holy Cross Church, Woodchurch, Wirral
 Holy Cross Church (Woodingdean), Woodingdean, Brighton and Hove

Wales
 Church of the Holy Cross, Mwnt, Ceredigion
 Church of the Holy Cross, Cowbridge, Vale of Glamorgan

United States

California
 Holy Cross Church (San Jose, California), San Jose

Illinois
 Eastside Community Center, Batavia, Illinois, formerly Holy Cross Church, NRHP-listed
 Holy Cross Church, Chicago, Illinois

Kentucky
 Holy Cross Church and School Complex-Latonia, Covington, Kentucky, NRHP-listed
 Holy Cross Catholic Church (Louisville, Kentucky), listed on the NRHP in the West End of Louisville, Kentucky

Maine
 Holy Cross Church, Lewiston, NRHP-listed

Maryland
 Holy Cross Roman Catholic Church (Baltimore, Maryland), NRHP-listed

Massachusetts
 Holy Cross Church, Boston (former Holy Cross Cathedral), located on Franklin Street in Boston, Massachusetts. In 1808 the church became the Cathedral of the Holy Cross. It was designed by Charles Bulfinch and was the first church built for the city's Roman Catholics

Minnesota
 Church of the Holy Cross-Episcopal, Dundas, Minnesota, listed on the NRHP in Rice County, Minnesota

Missouri
 Holy Cross Parish District, St. Louis, Missouri, listed on the NRHP in St. Louis, Missouri

New York
 Holy Cross Church (Bronx), New York City, a Roman Catholic church located in Soundview
 Holy Cross Church (Manhattan), a Roman Catholic in the Hell's Kitchen neighborhood of New York City
 Church of the Holy Cross (Troy, New York)
 Memorial Church of the Holy Cross, Utica, New York

Ohio
 Holy Cross Church, Rectory and School, Columbus, Ohio
 Holy Cross Lithuanian Roman Catholic Church, Dayton, Ohio

Rhode Island
 Church of the Holy Cross (Middletown, Rhode Island), in Middletown, Rhode Island, is a parish church of the Episcopal Diocese of Rhode Island of The Episcopal Church

South Carolina
 Church of the Holy Cross (Stateburg, South Carolina), also known as Holy Cross Episcopal Church

Washington
  Holy Cross Polish National Catholic Church, Pe Ell, Washington

Wisconsin
 Holy Cross Church and Convent, Green Bay, Wisconsin, listed on the NRHP in Brown County, Wisconsin
 Holy Cross Church (Kaukauna, Wisconsin), NRHP-listed

See also
 Cathedral of the Holy Cross (disambiguation)
 Elevation of Holy Cross Church, South Naknek, Alaska, listed on the NRHP in Bristol Bay Borough, Alaska
 Holy Cross Abbey (Cañon City, Colorado), 
 Chapel of the Holy Cross (Holderness, New Hampshire)
 Holy Cross Monastery (West Park, New York)
 Holy Cross Monastery and Chapel, Cincinnati, Ohio
 St Cross Church (disambiguation)

fr:Sainte-Croix#Patrimoine religieux